Bohusläningen is a daily newspaper, focusing on central and northern Bohuslän, as well as western Dalsland.

History and profile
The newspaper was founded in 1878 by Ture Malmgren (1851-1922), a local publisher and politician. Bohusläningen considers itself Independent Liberal in regards to politics. Headquartered in Uddevalla, the paper has local editorial offices in Henån, Munkedal, Färgelanda, Tanumshede, Kungshamn and Lysekil.

Bohusläningen was published in broadsheet format until October 2003 when its format was changed to tabloid format.

The circulation of Bohusläningen was 27,800 copies in 2012 and 26,700 copies in 2013.

References

External links
 Official website

1878 establishments in Sweden
Publications established in 1878
Daily newspapers published in Sweden
Swedish-language newspapers